Tompkins is a surname.  Notable people with the surname include:

 Aaron B. Tompkins (1844–1931), American cavalry soldier and Medal of Honor recipient
 Andrew Tompkins, Australian musician
 Angel Tompkins (born 1942), American actress
 Anne Tompkins (born 1962), American lawyer
 Arthur S. Tompkins (1865–1938), U.S. Representative from New York
 Barry Tompkins (born 1940), American sportscaster
 Bernard Tompkins (1904–1965), New York politician
 Brian Tompkins, Yale Varsity Soccer coach
 Caleb Tompkins (1759–1846), U.S. Representative from New York
 Charles Henry Tompkins (1830–1915), Union Brigadier General during the American Civil War
 Charles Hook Tompkins (1883–1956), American engineer and architect
 Chris Tompkins, American songwriter
 Christopher Tompkins (1780–1858), U.S. Representative from Kentucky
 Cydnor B. Tompkins (1810–1862), U.S. Representative from Ohio
 Daniel D. Tompkins (1775–1824), American Vice-President
 Darlene Tompkins (1940–2019), American actress
 Don Tompkins (1933–1982), American jewelry artist
 Douglas Tompkins (1943–2015), American environmentalist, co-founder of outdoor clothing companies, owner of Pumalín Park, Chile
 Emmett Tompkins (1853–1917), U.S. Representative from Ohio
 Fred Tompkins (born 1943), American jazz flautist
 Gwyn R. Tompkins (1861–1938), American horse racing trainer
 Hannah Tompkins (1721–1829), wife of Daniel D. Tompkins
 Hannah Tompkins (1920–1995), American artist
 Jack Tompkins (1909–1993), American baseball and ice hockey player
 James Tompkins, Australian rules footballer
 Jason Tompkins, British actor
 Jessie Tompkins (born 1959), former American athlete
 Joan Tompkins (1915–2005), American actress
 Joe Tompkins (born 1968), American professional skier
 Joe I. Tompkins, costume designer, see Academy Award for Best Costume Design
 Kris Tompkins (born 1950), American conservationist
 Larry Tompkins (born 1963), retired Irish Gaelic football manager
 Madeline Tompkins (born 1952), American airline pilot, co-pilot Aloha Airlines flight 243
 Mark Tompkins (racehorse trainer), British racehorse trainer
 Mark Tompkins (dancer) (born 1954), American-born French artist, dancer and choreographer
 Mark N. Tompkins (born 1975), Canadian-born film and theater painter and scenic artist
 Mike Tompkins (born 1948), U.S. politician
 Mike Tompkins (musician) (born 1987), Canadian musician
 Minthorne Tompkins (1807–1881), New York politician
 Oscar Tompkins (1893–1969), American lawyer
 Patrick W. Tompkins (died 1853), U.S. Representative from Mississippi
 Paul F. Tompkins (born 1968), American actor and comedian
 Pauline Tompkins (died 2004), American educator
 Peter Tompkins (1919–2007), American journalist
 Ptolemy Tompkins (born 1962), American writer
 Richard Tompkins (1918–1992), American entrepreneur
 Roger Tompkins (born 1952), British television commercial director
 Ronald G. Tompkins, American physician and academic
 Ross Tompkins (1938–2006), American jazz pianist
 Sally Louisa Tompkins (1833–1916), American humanitarian, nurse and philanthropist 
 Shawn Tompkins (1974–2011), Canadian former martial arts fighter
 Stephen Tompkins (born 1971), American artist and animator
 Steve Tompkins, American television writer
 Sue Tompkins (born 1971), British visual and sound artist
 Tony Tompkins (born 1982), Canadian football player

See also
 Tomkins (surname), including a list of people with the name

English-language surnames
Patronymic surnames
Surnames from given names